Theorema is a genus of butterflies.

Theorema is also Latin for "theorem", and a number of theorems are sometimes referred to by a Latin name in English, most notably two theorems of Carl Friedrich Gauss:
 Theorema Egregium, "Remarkable Theorem", best-known example
 Aureum Theorema, "Golden Theorem", better-known as quadratic reciprocity

See also 

 Teorema (disambiguation)
 Theory (disambiguation)
 Theorem